The National Association of State Boards of Accountancy (NASBA) is an association dedicated to serving the 56 state boards of accountancy. These are the boards that regulate the accountancy profession in the United States of America.

There is one board for each of the 50 states, plus the District of Columbia, Puerto Rico, U.S. Virgin Islands, Guam, Northern Mariana Islands, and American Samoa.

Structure of the U.S. accounting profession
In the United States, the designation of Certified Public Accountant (CPA) is granted at state level. Individual CPAs are not required to belong to the American Institute of Certified Public Accountants (AICPA), although many do.

NASBA acts primarily as a forum for the state boards themselves, as opposed to AICPA which represents CPAs as individuals.

Role of NASBA
NASBA's primary role is to:

 Act as a forum for state boards to discuss issues of common concern
 Encourage reciprocal recognition of the CPA qualification between states
 Enable state boards to speak with one voice in dealing with AICPA, the Federal Government, and other stakeholders

NASBA is a member of the International Federation of Accountants.

Uniform CPA Examination
Responsibility for the Uniform Certified Public Accountant Examination is shared between state boards of accountancy, the AICPA and NASBA:

 State boards of accountancy are responsible for assessing eligibility of candidates to sit for the CPA examination. Boards are also the final authority on communicating exam results received from NASBA to candidates.
 The AICPA is responsible for setting and scoring the examination, and transmitting scores to NASBA.
 NASBA maintains the National Candidate Database and matches score data received from the AICPA with candidate details. Most states offer online score reporting on NASBA's website at www.nasba.org. NASBA also maintains records for those who have passed the exam.

The AICPA and NASBA also coordinate and maintain mutual recognition agreements with foreign accountancy institutes. The only countries with such agreements includeAustralia, Canada, Hong Kong, Ireland, Mexico, Scotland, and New Zealand. Accountants from these countries who meet the specified criteria may be able to sit for the International Qualification Examination (IQEX) as an alternative to the Uniform CPA Exam. IQEX is also jointly administered by the AICPA and NASBA; however, state boards are not involved at the examination stage (only at licensure).

Boards of Accountancy 

List of Boards of Accountancy
 Alabama State Board of Public Accountancy
 Alaska Board of Public Accountancy
 American Samoa Territorial Board of Public Accountancy
 Arizona State Board of Accountancy
 Arkansas State Board of Public Accountancy
 California Board of Accountancy
 Commonwealth of the Northern Mariana Islands
 Colorado State Board of Accountancy
 Connecticut State Board of Accountancy
 Delaware State Board of Accountancy
 District of Columbia Board of Accountancy
 Florida Board of Accountancy
 Georgia State Board of Accountancy
 Guam Board of Accountancy
 Hawaii Board of Public Accountancy
 Idaho State Board of Accountancy
 Illinois Board of Examiners
 Illinois Department of Financial And Professional Regulation Public Accountancy Section
 Indiana Board of Accountancy
 Iowa Accountancy Examining Board
 Kansas Board of Accountancy
 Kentucky Board of Accountancy
 State Board of CPAs of Louisiana
 Maine Board of Accountancy
 Maryland Board of Public Accountancy
 Massachusetts Board of Public Accountancy
 Michigan State Board of Accountancy
 Minnesota State Board of Accountancy
 Mississippi State Board of Public Accountancy
 Missouri State Board of Accountancy
 Montana Board of Public Accountants
 Nebraska State Board of Public Accountancy
 Nevada State Board of Accountancy
 New Hampshire Board of Accountancy
 New Jersey State Board of Accountancy
 New Mexico Public Accountancy Board
 New York State Board for Public Accountancy
 North Carolina State Board of CPA Examiners
 North Dakota State Board of Accountancy
 Accountancy Board of Ohio
 Oklahoma Accountancy Board
 Oregon Board of Accountancy
 Pennsylvania State Board of Accountancy
 Puerto Rico Board of Accountancy
 Rhode Island Board of Accountancy
 South Carolina Board of Accountancy
 South Dakota Board of Accountancy
 Tennessee State Board of Accountancy
 Texas State Board of Public Accountancy
 Utah Board of Accountancy
 Vermont Board of Public Accountancy
 Virgin Islands Board of Public Accountancy
 Virginia Board of Accountancy
 Washington State Board of Accountancy
 West Virginia Board of Accountancy
 Wisconsin Accounting Examining Board
 Wyoming Board of Certified Public Accountants

See also
 American Institute of Certified Public Accountants
 Florida Board of Accountancy
 Florida Institute of CPAs

References

External links
 National Association of State Boards of Accountancy

Accounting organizations
Accounting in the United States
Government-related professional associations in the United States